The lacrimal nerve is the smallest branch of the ophthalmic nerve (CN V1), itself a branch of the trigeminal nerve (CN V). The other branches of the ophthalmic nerve are the frontal nerve and nasociliary nerve.

Structure

Origin 
The lacrimal nerve branches from the ophthalmic nerve immediately before traveling through the superior orbital fissure to enter the orbit.

The lacrimal nerve receives a communicating branch from the zygomatic nerve which may carry some post-ganglionic parasympathetic nerve fibres from the pterygopalatine ganglion.

Course 
It enters the orbit through the superior orbital fissure outside the common tendinous ring, and lateral to the frontal nerve, and trochlear nerve (CN IV). Once inside the orbit, it travels anterior-ward along the lateral wall of the orbit upon the upper margin of the lateral rectus muscle. It is accompanied by the lacrimal artery along its course through the orbit. It travels through the lacrimal gland, supplying the gland with sensory and parasympathetic branches, then continuing anteriorly as a few small sensory branches.

Function

Sensory 
The lacrimal nerve provides sensory innervation to the lacrimal gland, the skin and conjunctiva of the lateral portion of the upper eyelid and superior fornix, and the skin of the lateral forehead and scalp.

Parasympathetic 
The lacrimal nerve also provides parasympathetic innervation to the lacrimal gland from the communicating branch it receives from the zygomatic nerve.

Additional images

References

Ophthalmic nerve